Noel Ewart Odell FRSE FGS (25 December 1890 – 21 February 1987) was an English geologist and mountaineer. In 1924 he was an oxygen officer on the Everest expedition in which George Mallory and Andrew Irvine famously perished during their summit attempt. In 1936 Noel Odell with Bill Tilman climbed Nanda Devi, at the time the highest mountain climbed.

Early life

He was born at St Lawrence, Isle of Wight the son of Rev Robert William Odell and his wife, Mary Margaret Ewart.

He was educated at Brighton College and the Royal School of Mines, Imperial College. He received a doctorate (PhD) from Cambridge University.

He was an accomplished rock climber, joining the Alpine Club in 1916 and famous for his solo first ascent in 1919 of Tennis Shoe on the Idwal Slabs, in Snowdonia. Odell Gully in the Huntington Ravine of New Hampshire's Mount Washington is named after Odell, who was the first to accomplish its ascent in winter.

Everest 1924 

On 8 June 1924 George Mallory and Andrew Irvine attempted to climb to the top of Mount Everest via the Northeast Ridge route. Keen-sighted Odell reported seeing them at 12:50 p.m. ascending one of the major "steps" on the North-East ridge, "the last step but one from the base of the final pyramid" and "going strongly for the top." But no evidence thus far has proved that they reached the summit, or that they ascended above the major Second Step. They never returned and perished on the mountain. Odell was the last person to see the pair alive.

In his first two accounts, written between June and November 1924, Odell was certain he had seen Mallory and Irvine climbing the Second Step. But in the expedition account published in 1925, and after mounting skepticism from members of the climbing community as to whether it was the Second Step or the lower First Step, Odell conceded it might have been the First Step where he had seen the pair.  After he had been rejected as too old for the next Everest expedition, he recanted his change of mind and returned to the belief that he had seen the two climbers surmount the Second Step. Had they done so, there would have been a fair chance that one of them, at least, might have reached the summit.

Achievements 
In 1936 Noel Odell with Bill Tilman successfully reached the summit of Nanda Devi which at the time, and until 1950, was the highest mountain climbed. Odell returned to Everest with the expedition led by Tilman in 1938.

Noel Odell had a colourful career outside mountaineering as well, serving with the Royal Engineers in both World Wars, as a consultant in the petroleum and mining industries, and teaching geology at a number of universities around the world, including Harvard and Cambridge. He was Professor of Geology at the University of Otago in New Zealand and Peshawar University in Pakistan.

In 1944 he was elected a Fellow of the Royal Society of Edinburgh. His proposers were Sir James Wordie, George Tyrrell, Sir Arthur Trueman and John Weir.

Family
In 1917 he married Gwladys Jones (died 1977).

Publications
The Geology of the Eastern Parts of Central Spitzbergen (1927)
Geological and some other Observations in the Mount Everest Region (1938)
The Petrography of the Franz Josef Fjord Region (1955)

Legacy
In the 2010 documentary film about Mallory's expedition, The Wildest Dream, Alan Rickman acts as the voice of Noel Odell.

Footnotes

Sources
 George Band, ‘Odell, Noel Ewart (1890–1987)’, rev. Oxford Dictionary of National Biography, Oxford University Press, 2004; online edn, Oct 2006

1890 births
1987 deaths
People from the Isle of Wight
20th-century British geologists
British rock climbers
English mountain climbers
Harvard University staff
Academic staff of the University of Otago